Victorin's warbler (Cryptillas victorini) or Victorin's scrub warbler, is a species of African warbler, formerly placed in the family Sylviidae. It was recently split from the genus Bradypterus and now belongs to a monotypic genus Cryptillas.

It is endemic to the fynbos of South Africa's coastal Afromontane area.

The common name and scientific name commemorates  Johan Fredrik Victorin (1831-1855), a Swedish traveler who visited South Africa.

References

 BirdLife International 2004.  Bradypterus victorini.   2006 IUCN Red List of Threatened Species.   Downloaded on 10 July 2007.

External links
 Victorin's warbler - Species text in The Atlas of Southern African Birds.

Fynbos
Victorin's warbler
Endemic birds of South Africa
Victoria's warbler
Taxonomy articles created by Polbot